Tayzin (also spelled Tizin) is a village in northwestern Syria, administratively part of the Hama Governorate, located just west of Hama. Nearby localities include Matnin to the north, al-Rabiaa to the southwest, Umm al-Tuyur to the west, Kafr al-Tun to the north and Shihat Hama to the northeast. According to the Central Bureau of Statistics (CBS), Tayzin had a population of 5,072 in the 2004 census. Its inhabitants are predominantly Sunni Muslims.

References

Bibliography

 

Populated places in Hama District